Luca Bellisomo (born 25 October 1986 in Johannesburg) is a South African-born Canadian soccer player who last played for Finnish Veikkausliiga club IFK Mariehamn.

Career

Youth and College
Bellisomo was born in South Africa, and moved with his family to the Greater Vancouver area in 1994. He played youth soccer on Lower Mainland, before moving again with his family, this time to Australia in 2001

In Australia, Bellisomo was student at The Cathedral School of St Anne & St James in the Australian town of Townsville, Queensland, and went on to play for the Queensland Academy of Sport, the Queensland U-17 state team, and the North Queensland schoolboys side. He also played on a couple of senior men’s soccer teams, notably the Brisbane Wolves in the Queensland Soccer Federation XXXX League.

He returned to Canada in 2004 and played four years of college soccer at Simon Fraser University, where he was named an NAIA Third Team All-American in his third year  and First Team All American in his final year. He subsequently joined the Vancouver Whitecaps youth academy, Vancouver Whitecaps Residency, and played for the team in the USL Premier Development League in 2008.

Professional
Bellisomo was called up to the senior Vancouver Whitecaps side on 18 August 2008 and played 11 games in the USL First Division. He was signed to a full professional contract by the Whitecaps in February, 2009 and continued to play for the senior team in 2010.

Bellisomo moved to Finland in 2011 when he signed for Veikkausliiga club IFK Mariehamn. He made his debut for Mariehamn on 18 January 2011 in a 4–0 victory over FC Haka in the Finnish League Cup.

International
Bellisomo captained Canada to a fourth-place finish at the 2007 Summer Universiade in Bangkok, Thailand, eventually finishing in fourth place when Canada lost on penalties to hosts Thailand in the bronze medal playoff game.  He also played 3 seasons with for Vancouver Columbus FC in 2006, 2007 and 2008.

Honours

Vancouver Whitecaps
USL First Division championship (1): 2008

Club Statistics

Updated: 20 October 2010.

References

External links
 Vancouver Whitecaps bio

1986 births
Living people
White South African people
South African emigrants to Canada
Association football defenders
Canadian soccer players
Sportspeople from Johannesburg
People from Townsville
Simon Fraser Clan men's soccer players
USL League Two players
USL First Division players
USSF Division 2 Professional League players
Vancouver Whitecaps (1986–2010) players
Vancouver Whitecaps Residency players
Canada men's youth international soccer players
Veikkausliiga players
IFK Mariehamn players
Canadian expatriate soccer players
Expatriate footballers in Finland
Canadian expatriate sportspeople in Finland